Victor J. Boschini Jr. (born 1956) is the current chancellor at Texas Christian University. He assumed office as the university's tenth chancellor on June 1, 2003. He also holds the rank of professor of education. He was previously president of Illinois State University.

Early life
Born in Cleveland, Ohio, son of Victor Sr. and Elizabeth Boschini, is an alum of Normandy High School. He received his bachelor's degree from Mount Union College in 1978. He was awarded a Master of Arts degree in personnel from Bowling Green State University in 1979. His doctorate was awarded to him at Indiana University in 1989 in higher education administration.

Career
Boschini came to TCU after serving as president of Illinois State University from 1999 to 2003. At Illinois State, Boschini also was associate professor in the Department of Educational Administration and Foundations in the College of Education and taught a class each semester throughout his presidency. In addition, Boschini was a member of the board of directors of the Illinois Campus Compact, a coalition of college and university presidents committed to helping students develop the values and skills of citizenship through participation in public and community service. 

Boschini led a major fundraising campaign while at Illinois State. It was also during his tenure the university established its first endowed chair.

From 1997 to 1999, Boschini served as Illinois State's vice president for Student Affairs.

Prior to his tenure at Illinois State, he was associate provost at Butler University in Indianapolis, Indiana, and also taught in Butler's College of Education. He previously spent eight years at Indiana University in various administrative posts, as well as teaching in the university's School of Education.

Boschini serves on the board of the State Farm Company Mutual Funds, as well as on the boards of the Fort Worth Symphony Orchestra and the Van Cliburn Foundation. He is also a member of the Board of Trustees of Brite Divinity School. In early March, 2011, Boschini was elected to the board of trustees of the American Council on Education (ACE).

In a 2021 interview with the Fort Worth Star-Telegram, Boschini indicated that he plans to retire in 2026.

General references

External links
Victor John Boschini Jr. | Milner Library – Illinois State 
Victor John Boschini Jr. Presidential Papers | Dr. JoAnn Rayfield Archives at Illinois State University
Office of Chancellor Victor J. Boschini Jr. (primary source)

Living people
Texas Christian University people
People from Fort Worth, Texas
Bowling Green State University alumni
Indiana University faculty
Presidents of Illinois State University
Butler University faculty
University of Mount Union alumni
1956 births